Rajmund Fodor (born 21 February 1976 in Szeged) is a Hungarian water polo player, who played on the gold medal squads at the 2000 Summer Olympics and 2004 Summer Olympics. He is nicknamed Rajmi, and made his debut for the national team in 1993. He studied at Radnóti Miklós High School in Szeged.

He is married and he has a daughter: Nadine (born 2 September 2005).

Honours

National
 Olympic Games:  Gold medal - 2000, 2004
 World Championships:  Gold medal - 2003;  Silver medal - 1998, 2005, 2007
 European Championship:  Gold medal - 1997, 1999;  Silver medal - 1993, 1995, 2006;  Bronze medal - 2001, 2003
 FINA World League:  Gold medal - 2003, 2004;  Silver medal - 2007;  Bronze medal - 2002
 FINA World Cup:  Gold medal - 1995, 1999;  Silver medal - 1993, 2002, 2006;  Bronze medal - 1997
 Junior World Championships: (Gold medal - 1995; Bronze medal - 1991, 1993)
 Junior European Championship: (Gold medal - 1992, 1994)

Club
 Cup Winners' Cup Winners (1): (2001 - with Florentia)
 Hungarian Championship (OB I): 4x (2003, 2004, 2005, 2006 - with Bp. Honvéd)
 Hungarian Cup (Magyar Kupa): 2x (1996 (2) - with FTC; 2006 - with Bp. Honvéd)
 Saudi-Arabian Championship: 1x (2011 - with Al-Ittihad)

Awards
 Masterly youth athlete: 1993, 1994, 1995
 Member of the Hungarian team of year: 1993, 1997, 1999, 2000, 2003, 2004

Orders
   Officer's Cross of the Order of Merit of the Republic of Hungary (2000)
   Commander's Cross of the Order of Merit of the Republic of Hungary (2004)

See also
 Hungary men's Olympic water polo team records and statistics
 List of Olympic champions in men's water polo
 List of Olympic medalists in water polo (men)
 List of world champions in men's water polo
 List of World Aquatics Championships medalists in water polo

References

External links
 
 

1976 births
Living people
Sportspeople from Szeged
Hungarian male water polo players
Water polo drivers
Water polo players at the 1996 Summer Olympics
Water polo players at the 2000 Summer Olympics
Water polo players at the 2004 Summer Olympics
Medalists at the 2000 Summer Olympics
Medalists at the 2004 Summer Olympics
Olympic gold medalists for Hungary in water polo
World Aquatics Championships medalists in water polo
Hungarian water polo coaches
20th-century Hungarian people
21st-century Hungarian people